Cardiovirus are a group of viruses within order Picornavirales, family Picornaviridae. Vertebrates serve as natural hosts for these viruses.

Taxonomy
There are currently six species in the genus:
 Cardiovirus A
 Cardiovirus B
 Cardiovirus C
 Cardiovirus D
 Cardiovirus E
 Cardiovirus F

Cardiovirus A is composed of only one serotype, encephalomyocarditis virus (EMCV). Cardiovirus B consists of four viruses that are most probably serologically distinct. These are Theiler's Murine encephalomyelitis virus (TMEV), Vilyuisk human encephalomyelitis virus (VHEV), a Theiler-like rat virus (TRV) (which has yet to be named) and Saffold virus (SAF-V). Of these 4, only VHEV and SAF-V are thought to cause infection in humans. Thus far, Cardiovirus C has only been observed in the brown rat.

Structure
Cardioviruses are single-stranded RNA, non-enveloped viruses with icosahedral or spherical geometries, and a T=pseudo3 icosahedral capsid protein geometry. The diameter is around 30 nm. Genomes are linear and non-segmented, around 7.8 kb in length. The T=pseudo3 icosahedral capsid of Cadiovirus is made of 60 protomers, each of which contains 4 polypeptides: VP1, VP2, VP3, and VP4. Inside the capsid of the virus there is a single linear, positive single-stranded RNA. On both the 3' and 5' ends of the genome there are untranslated regions . These untranslated regions of genome are important for the DNA replication, with the untranslated region on the 5' side being the location of internal ribosomal entry site (IRES).

Life cycle
Viral replication is cytoplasmic. Entry into the host cell is achieved by attachment of the virus to host receptors, which mediates endocytosis. Replication follows the positive stranded RNA virus replication model. Positive stranded rna virus transcription is the method of transcription. Translation takes place by −1 ribosomal frameshifting, viral initiation, and  ribosomal skipping. The virus exits the host cell by lysis, and  viroporins.
Human and  vertebrates serve as the natural host. Transmission routes are zoonosis and fomite.

The 3’ end of the genome encodes a polyA tail while the 5’ end encodes a genome-linked protein. A unique feature of this genus is the presence of the L* protein, 18kDa, that is made out of frame from the polyprotein and is present in the DA subgroup of TMEV. It has been found to be important for the virus pathogenesis.

In the case of Cardiovirus A, the virus can cause encephalitis and myocarditis, mostly in rodents, which are natural hosts. The virus is transmitted from rodents to other animals. Severe epidemics have been seen in swine and elephants.

Replication of cardioviruses is dependent on a structured RNA element called the Cardiovirus cis-acting replication element (CRE).

Clinical
Human cardioviruses were first isolated in 1981. Seven additional isolates have since been described in North America, Europe and South Asia. They have been associated with gastroenteritis, influenza-like symptoms and non-polio-associated acute flaccid paralysis. The first infection of cardiovirus in humans was identified in 2007 in a stool sample of an infant that was experiencing fever of unknown origin. It was subsequently named the Saffold virus after the lead researcher, Morris Saffold Jones.

Other pathogenic cardioviruses isolated from humans include the Syr-Darya valley fever virus and Vilyuisk human encephalomyelitis virus. Diseases associated with cardioviruses include: myocarditis, encephalitis, multiple sclerosis, and type 1 diabetes.

See also
 Saffold virus (Cardiovirus B)
 Theiler's encephalomyelitis virus

References

External links
 Viralzone: Cardiovirus
 ICTV

Virus genera